Leon Daelemans (born 18 April 1949) is a former Belgian cyclist. He competed in the team pursuit event at the 1972 Summer Olympics.

References

External links
 

1949 births
Living people
Belgian male cyclists
Olympic cyclists of Belgium
Cyclists at the 1972 Summer Olympics
Cyclists from Limburg (Belgium)
People from Neerpelt